The Nanjing Dashengguan Yangtze River Bridge, formerly Third Nanjing Yangtze Bridge, is the first cable-stayed bridge with steel tower stanchions located in Nanjing, China. It is the third crossing of the Yangtze River at Nanjing. The cable-stayed portion is just a part of the 4.7 kilometers of the complete bridge. Constructed in slightly more than two years at a cost of $490 million, this bridge features dual 215 meters towers.  The main span measures 648 meters. When it was completed in 2005 it was the third longest cable stayed span in the world. It still ranks among the top 20. The bridge carries the G42 Shanghai–Chengdu Expressway and the G2503 Nanjing Ring Expressway. The bridge has renamed on 20 December 2019.

Structure 
The deck superstructure is an orthotropic box girder 3.2 m deep and 37.5 wide that accommodates three lanes of traffic in each direction. Also the bridge has a center lane used in case of emergency. The deck is supported by 168 stay cables. Each cable is formed by 109 to 241 wires 7 mm in diameter and 215 m in height.

Funding 
The bridge was financed by a joint venture of Chinese public-sector and corporate entities. China's Highway Planning and Design Institute, part of the Ministry of Communications, led the design team.

See also
List of largest cable-stayed bridges
List of tallest bridges in the world
Yangtze River bridges and tunnels

References 

Bridges over the Yangtze River
Cable-stayed bridges in China
Bridges completed in 2005
Bridges in Jiangsu